Afrowatsonius sudanicus is a moth of the  family Erebidae. It is found in Sudan.

References

 Natural History Museum Lepidoptera generic names catalog

Endemic fauna of Sudan
Spilosomina
Moths described in 1933
Moths of Africa